Maximiliano is a masculine name of Iberian origin, with its original derivation from the Latin word "maximum", which literally translates to "greatest". In fact, as a byproduct of imperialism, the name has become very common in Latin America and rivals that of its notability in the Iberian Peninsula.

Notable people with the name include:

Maximiliano Alaníz (born 1990), Argentine footballer
Maximiliano Arboleya (1870–1951), Spanish sociologist, priest and activist
Maximiliano Arias (born 1988), Uruguayan footballer
Maximiliano Asís (born 1987), Argentine footballer
Maximiliano Badell (born 1988), Argentine footballer
Maximiliano Bajter (born 1986), Uruguayan footballer
Maximiliano Blanco (born 1977), Argentine footballer
Maximiliano Bustos (born 1982), Argentine footballer
Maximiliano Bustos (rugby union) (born 1986), Argentine rugby union player
Maximiliano Caire (born 1988), Argentine footballer
Maximiliano Caldas (born 1973), Argentine field hockey player
Maximiliano Calzada (born 1990), Uruguayan footballer
Maximiliano Cejas (born 1980), Argentine footballer
Maximiliano Ceratto (born 1988), Argentine footballer
Maximiliano Coronel (born 1989), Argentine footballer
Maximiliano Cuberas (born 1973), Argentine footballer
Maximiliano Estévez (born 1977), Argentine footballer
Maximiliano Faotto (1910–?), Uruguayan footballer and manager
Maximiliano Flotta (born 1978), Argentine footballer
Maximiliano Gagliardo (born 1983), Argentine footballer
Maximiliano Giusti (born 1991), Argentine footballer
Maximiliano Gómez (1943–1971), Dominican Republic Maoist politician
Maximiliano Hernández Martínez (1882–1966), President of El Salvador
Maximiliano Jones (1871–1944), Equatoguinean farmer
Maximiliano Kosteki (1980–2002), Argentine activist
Maximiliano Larroquette, American automobile designer
Maximiliano Laso (born 1988), Argentine footballer
Maximiliano Andrés Laso (born 1988), Argentine footballer
Maximiliano Lélis Rodrigues (born 1987), Brazilian footballer
Maximiliano Leonel Rodríguez (born 1994), Argentine footballer
Maximiliano Lombardi (born 1987), Uruguayan footballer
Maximiliano Mirabet (born 1982), Argentine footballer
Maximiliano Montero (born 1988), Uruguayan footballer
Maximiliano Moralez (born 1985), Argentine footballer
Maximiliano Núñez (born 1986), Argentine footballer
Maximiliano Oliva (born 1990), Argentine footballer
Maximiliano Pellegrino (born 1980), Argentine footballer
Maximiliano Pereira (born 1984), Uruguayan footballer
Maximiliano Pérez (born 1986), Argentine footballer
Maximiliano Poblete (1873–1946), Chilean politician
Maximiliano Ré (born 1987), Argentine footballer
Maximiliano Richeze (born 1983), Argentine cyclist
Maximiliano Scapparoni (born 1989), Argentine footballer
Maximiliano Silerio Esparza, Mexican politician
Maximiliano Stanic (born 1978), Argentine basketball player
Maximiliano Timpanaro (born 1988), Argentine footballer
Maximiliano Uggè (born 1991), Italian footballer
Maximiliano Urruti (born 1991), Argentine footballer
Maximiliano Vallejo (born 1982), Argentine footballer
Maximiliano Velázquez (born 1980), Argentine footballer

See also
Maximilian

Spanish masculine given names